Boyan Jovanovic is a professor of economics at New York University and a long-term consultant at the Federal Reserve Bank of Richmond.

Jovanovic, of Serbian descent, received his Bachelor's and master's degrees from the London School of Economics and his Ph.D. in Economics from the University of Chicago.

Boyan Jovanovic is a Fellow of the American Academy of Arts and Sciences and the Econometric Society. He has won the 2019 Global Award for Entrepreneurship Research.

See also
Mean-field game theory

External links
 Personal homepage 

21st-century American economists
Alumni of the London School of Economics
American people of Serbian descent
Serbian economists
Fellows of the Econometric Society
Fellows of the American Academy of Arts and Sciences
1951 births
Living people
20th-century American economists
New York University faculty